Liam Hourican is an Irish actor, best known for his roles in BBC Three comedy Murder in Successville.

As well being on television, he is also a voice actor.

Hourican has worked as a stand-up comedian.

Hourican appeared in various comedy roles on TV over the following years and in 2015 he co-starred in Murder in Successville. The semi-improvised show, in which a celebrity guest must help DI Sleet solve a fictional crime, became a cult hit.

Hourican is an accomplished stage actor.

Filmography

Television

 The IT Crowd (2010)
 Murder in Successville (2015–2017) - Various
 Penny Dreadful (2016)

Films
 Song of the Sea (2014 film) - Spud, Bus Driver
 The Secret of Kells
 La Cha Cha

References

External links

Place of birth missing (living people)
Living people
Year of birth missing (living people)
Irish male television actors
Irish male film actors
Irish male voice actors